A list of Monash University people, including a number of notable alumni and staff.

Notable alumni

Politics and government

Law

Media and arts

Business

Medicine and science

Social services and academia

Sport

Notable staff (past and present)

Creative arts

Humanities and social sciences

Law

Medicine and life sciences

Physical sciences

Administration

Vice-Chancellors

Chancellors

References

External links
 Monash Expertline

Monash
List
University